The Immenhof Girls (German: Die Mädels vom Immenhof) is a 1955 West German comedy drama film directed by Wolfgang Schleif and starring Heidi Brühl, Margarete Haagen and Paul Henckels. It was filmed using Eastmancolor. The film's sets were designed by the art director Karl Weber. Location shooting took place around Schleswig-Holstein.

Cast
 Angelika Meissner as 	Dick 
 Heidi Brühl as 	Dalli
 Christiane König as 	Angela
 Margarete Haagen as Oma Jantzen
 Paul Henckels as 	Dr. Pudlich
 Paul Klinger as 	Jochen von Roth
 Josef Sieber as 	Hein Daddel
 Matthias Fuchs as Ethelbert
 Tilo von Berlepsch as 	Gerichtsvollzieher
 Dirk Dautzenberg as Herr Pötz, Feriengast	
 Ruth Lommel as Esther Brandt, Feriengast	
 Peter Tost as 	Mans

References

Bibliography
 Hake, Sabine. German National Cinema. Routledge, 2002.

External links 
 

1955 films
1955 comedy films
German comedy films
West German films
1950s German-language films
Films directed by Wolfgang Schleif
1950s German films

de:Die Mädels vom Immenhof